New Seasons is an album by Canadian alternative country band The Sadies. It was released in 2007 on Outside Music in Canada and Yep Roc in the United States.

The album was a longlisted nominee for the 2008 Polaris Music Prize, and a shortlisted nominee for Roots & Traditional Album of the Year - Group at the 2008 Juno Awards.

Track listing

References

2007 albums
The Sadies albums
Outside Music albums